The 1930 UK & Ireland Greyhound Racing Year was the fifth year of greyhound racing in the United Kingdom and Ireland.

Summary
Mick the Miller now trained by Sidney Orton successfully defended his English Greyhound Derby title and in the process propelled greyhound racing into a boom period that would last for over thirty years. A crowd of 50,000 witnessed the brindle dog win the 1930 English Greyhound Derby at White City Stadium on 28 June.  

Following the Derby win, he then won the Cesarewitch at West Ham Stadium over the longer distance of 600 yards and the Welsh Greyhound Derby at White City Stadium, Cardiff, winning the final by ten lengths in a new track and national record of 29.55. His season ended when he finished lame during the Laurels, a new event introduced at Wimbledon Stadium. The total annual attendance across the country for 1930 increased to 17,119,120 from 15,855,162 (in 1929), a fourth consecutive annual increase.

Tracks
The Greyhound Racing Association (GRA) continued to acquire tracks and purchased White City Stadium (Manchester) from the Canine Sports Ltd company. The circuit was 450 yards in circumference with wide well banked turns and an inside Sumner hare. Further tracks continued to open including Charlton and the Irish tracks of Dundalk and Tralee. Romford moved to a new site after £600 was raised to build a stand in a nearby field next to the original site. The independent track (flapping track) in Portsmouth closed down on 29 November due to plans to open a larger track nearby at Target Road.

News
Trainers Stanley Biss and Ken Appleton left Wimbledon for West Ham. John Bilsland bought out Jimmy Shand for £400,000 leaving the Electric Hare Company under the control of Bilsland. Blinkers were used at Wimbledon for the first and only time, the experiment to stop ungenuine greyhounds from fighting failed.

Competitions
Bradshaw Fold was the leading bitch in training and the unluckiest because following her second place to Mick the Miller in the Derby final she was unplaced in a second consecutive Oaks final. Fellow Derby finalist So Green also reached the St Leger final, the last major race of the year.

Tracks opened

Roll of honour

+ unofficial National Derby

Principal UK races

+ Track record

Principal Irish finals

Key
U = unplaced

References 

Greyhound racing in the United Kingdom
Greyhound racing in the Republic of Ireland
1930 in British sport
1930 in Irish sport
1930 in Welsh sport
1930 in Scottish sport